A prefectural capital is a city where a prefectural government and assembly is located.

Japan
In Japan, a prefectural capital is officially called , but the term  is also used.

List of Japanese prefectural capitals

Notes: ¹

Non-capitals which share a name with their prefecture
In most cases, a city that shares a name with its prefecture is a prefectural capital. However, there are some municipalities that are not capitals.
Iwate, Iwate Prefecture
Ibaraki, Ibaraki Prefecture
Okinawa, Okinawa Prefecture
Tochigi, Tochigi Prefecture
Yamanashi, Yamanashi Prefecture

Capitals that are not the largest city/metropolitan area in their prefecture
Those in italics are prefectural capitals, or metropolitan areas of them.

Notes:
City populations are as of July 2008.
Metropolitan area populations are as of 2000. (Urban Employment Areas)

References

Japan, Prefecture
Capitals